Z Train could refer to:

North America 

The J/Z (New York City Subway service)
Z-Train, a proposed passenger train service that would operate primarily on Union Pacific Railroad lines between Los Angeles and Las Vegas

Europe 

The  service, a VR commuter rail service on the Kerava-Lahti railway in Finland